Richard John Pankhurst (1940–2013) was a British computer scientist, botanist and academic. From 1963 to 1966 he worked at CERN, then from 1966 to 1974 on computer-aided design at Cambridge University, and from 1974 to 1991 at the Natural History Museum as curator of the British herbarium. In 1991, he became a Principal Scientific Officer at the Royal Botanic Garden Edinburgh.

He published over fifty peer reviewed papers and sat on several committees:

 Botanical Society of the British Isles: Committee for Scotland; Database Committee
 Botanical Society of Scotland: Council
 Biodiversity Information Standards (TDWG): Descriptors Group (as convenor)
 International Organisation for Plant Information:  Information Systems Committee, Checklist Committee (co-convener)

His book Biological Identification (1978) has been described as " the first textbook on computer methods in identification".

Pankhurst died in 2013, a year after the species Taraxacum pankhurstianum, endemic to St. Kilda, was named in his honour, for his suggestion that the seed from which it was grown at Edinburgh be collected.

Selected works

References 

1940 births
2013 deaths
British botanists
British computer scientists
People associated with the University of Cambridge
People associated with CERN